Strawbery Banke is an outdoor history museum located in the South End historic district of Portsmouth, New Hampshire. It is the oldest neighborhood in New Hampshire to be settled by Europeans, and the earliest neighborhood remaining in the present-day city of Portsmouth. It features more than 37 restored buildings built between the 17th and 19th centuries in the Colonial, Georgian, and Federal style architectures. The buildings once clustered around a waterway known as Puddle Dock, which was filled in around 1900. Today the former waterway appears as a large open space.

History
The neighborhood's history goes back to 1630, when Captain Walter Neale chose the area to build a settlement, naming it after the wild berries growing along the Piscataqua River. Strawbery Banke existed as a neighborhood for a little over three centuries from 1630 to the late 1950s. The neighborhood's buildings were saved from 1950s urban renewal by the efforts of a large group of historic preservationists. Strawbery Banke opened as a museum in 1965.

Education
Seventeen historic houses are open to the public as furnished historic interiors. Guests learn from staff interpreters the history and lifestyles of each house and how it reflects the social changes of its time period. In some houses, costumed roleplayers portray characters from time periods past. In others, historical interpreters educate visitors about the history. There are also five formal exhibits on archaeology, architecture, woodworking tools and skills, post-and-beam construction, and amusements and entertainment. Hearth cooking, weaving, basket weaving, and coopering  demonstrations and tours are offered during a daily program season. Seasonal events are also held around major holidays.

Across the street from the museum are the riverside gardens and entertainments of Prescott Park.

Strawbery Banke was featured in Bob Vila's A&E Network production, Guide to Historic Homes of America.

Photo gallery

See also
National Register of Historic Places listings in Rockingham County, New Hampshire

Notes

References

Further reading
Robinson, J. Dennis (2008) Strawbery Banke: A Seaport Museum 400 Years in the Making,

External links

 Official website

Houses on the National Register of Historic Places in New Hampshire
Historic districts on the National Register of Historic Places in New Hampshire
Historic house museums in New Hampshire
Museums in Portsmouth, New Hampshire
Open-air museums in New Hampshire
Living museums in New Hampshire
Historic districts in Rockingham County, New Hampshire
Houses in Portsmouth, New Hampshire
National Register of Historic Places in Portsmouth, New Hampshire